Rivaldo Ibarra Thompson (born 6 July 1999) is a Cuban footballer who plays as a midfielder.

Career

Fort Lauderdale
Ibarra joined Fort Lauderdale CF in early 2020, prior to the club's inaugural season in USL League One. He made his competitive debut for the club on 24 September 2020, coming on as a 77th-minute substitute for Blaine Ferri in a 2–1 away defeat to the Richmond Kickers.

References

External links
Rivaldo Ibarra at SofaScore

1999 births
Living people
Inter Miami CF II players
USL League One players
Cuban footballers
Cuba under-20 international footballers
Cuban expatriate footballers
Association football midfielders
Cuban expatriate sportspeople in the United States
Expatriate soccer players in the United States